Peter Aase (born 27 March 1995) is a Norwegian footballer who plays as a midfielder for Norwegian club Lysekloster IL.

Aase made his senior debut for Florø SK in 2010. A Norway youth international, he was bought by larger neighbors Sogndal Fotball in the summer of 2012 and made his Eliteserien debut in September 2012 against Strømsgodset. In 2013 and 2014 he played for Florø, rejoining Sogndal in the summer of 2015 to play the closer of the 2015 1. divisjon. In 2016, he was loaned out to Åsane Fotball in the spring and to Florø in the autumn. The loan continued until the summer of 2017, when the move was made permanent. In mid-2019 he went on to Sotra SK, and ahead of the 2020 season was signed by Lysekloster IL. His twin brother, Stefan Aase, already played there.

References

1995 births
Living people
Norwegian footballers
People from Flora, Norway
Association football midfielders
Florø SK players
Sogndal Fotball players
Åsane Fotball players
Eliteserien players
Norwegian First Division players
Norwegian Second Division players
Norwegian Third Division players
Norwegian Fourth Division players
Norway youth international footballers
Sportspeople from Vestland